Guia is a former civil parish in the municipality of Pombal, Portugal. In 2013, the parish merged into the new parish Guia, Ilha e Mata Mourisca. It had a population of 2,726 (2001) and an area of 37.91 km².

References

Former parishes of Pombal, Portugal
Populated places disestablished in 2013
2013 disestablishments in Portugal